Ninnie Asp (born 1950) is a Swedish contemporary silversmith. Her work is included in the Nationalmuseum in Sweden.

Publications

References 

Living people
1950 births
Swedish silversmiths